Flannigan Township is one of twelve townships in Hamilton County, Illinois, USA.  As of the 2010 census, its population was 116 and it contained 74 housing units.

Geography

Unincorporated towns
 Braden at 
 Rural Hill at 
 Tuckers Corners at 
 West Rural Hill at 
(This list is based on USGS data and may include former settlements.)

Cemeteries
The township contains these four cemeteries: Cartwright, Little Springs, Knights Prairie and Lampley.
Several Revolutionary War veterans are buried at Little Springs.  
Cartwright cemetery is named after Methodist evangelist and Illinois statesman Peter Cartwright.

Demographics

School districts
 Hamilton County Community Unit School District 10

Political districts
 Illinois's 19th congressional district
 State House District 117
 State Senate District 59

References
 United States Census Bureau 2008 TIGER/Line Shapefiles
 
 United States National Atlas

External links
 Hamilton County Historical Society
 City-Data.com
 Illinois State Archives
 Township Officials of Illinois

Townships in Hamilton County, Illinois
Mount Vernon, Illinois micropolitan area
Townships in Illinois
1885 establishments in Illinois